Levan Abelishvili was a Georgian electrical engineer.

Early life
He was born on April 3, 1909 into a noble family in Tbilisi. His father, Gregory Abelishvili, was the head of the Transcaucasian railway. His mother, Antonina Abelishvili, became the first Georgian cinema actress when she starred in the title role in the 1918 movie Qristine, produced by Alexandere Tsutsunava.

In 1931, he graduated from the Transcaucasian Energy Institute.

Career
He was a doctor of technical sciences (1955) and a professor (1956).

He was a pioneer of electric traction transport in Georgia and the USSR. His works deal with electric traction's efficiency, its calculation, the theory of rolling stock and electrical systems and the study of electrified railways' forced modes middle voltage drop by diagrams in the interaction of all elements, thermal design and testing of traction motors, heating theory of contact conductors, the calculation of inertial weight of long trains.

He was the founder of the Electric Vehicles department at the Georgian Technical University.

Recognition 
He was a corresponding member of the Georgian National Academy of Sciences of the Georgian SSR (1961), an honored worker of science and technology of Georgia (1967), and a member of the main editorial board of the Georgian Soviet Encyclopedia.

References 

1909 births
1974 deaths
Scientists from Georgia (country)
Soviet scientists
Recipients of the Order of Lenin
Soviet electrical engineers
Corresponding Members of the Georgian National Academy of Sciences